Braden Eves (born May 3, 1999) is an American racing driver. He currently competes in the Indy Pro 2000 Championship with Jay Howard Driver Development. Eves earned his first Indy Pro 2000 Championship win at the Mid-Ohio Sports Car Course in 2020.

Racing record

Career summary

* Season still in progress.

American open–wheel racing results

U.S. F2000 National Championship
(key) (Races in bold indicate pole position) (Races in italics indicate fastest lap) (Races with * indicate most race laps led)

Indy Pro 2000 Championship 
(key) (Races in bold indicate pole position) (Races in italics indicate fastest lap) (Races with * indicate most race laps led)

References

External links
  
  

1999 births
Living people
Racing drivers from Columbus, Ohio
Racing drivers from Ohio
U.S. F2000 National Championship drivers

Indy Pro 2000 Championship drivers
Newman Wachs Racing drivers
United States F4 Championship drivers